Grindstone Butte is a summit in Haakon County, South Dakota, in the United States.

Grindstone Butte's name comes from the Native Americans of the area, who collected their grindstones from this summit.

References

Landforms of Haakon County, South Dakota
Mountains of South Dakota